Refik Anadol (born 1985) is a Turkish-American new media artist and designer. His projects consist of data-driven machine learning algorithms that create abstract, dream-like environments. He lives and works in Los Angeles.

Early life and education 
Anadol was born and raised in Istanbul, Turkey. He received a Bachelor of Arts degree in photography and video and a Master of Fine Arts degree from Bilgi University in Istanbul. After his studies in Turkey, he moved to the United States to attend the Design Media Arts program at the University of California in Los Angeles where he received a second Master of Fine Arts degree. Anadol currently lives in Los Angeles, California, where Refik Anadol Studio and RAS LAB are based. RAS LAB is dedicated to researching and cultivating “new ways to data narratives and artificial intelligence”.

Work 
Anadol started his career creating permanent public art commissions such as the Virtual Depictions (2015) project in San Francisco and the Wind of Boston (2017) data painting in South Boston, both of which used digital data.

Other permanent public art installations are Interconnected (2018), a 2,147 square feet of animated art screen at Charlotte Douglas International Airport, Virtual Applique at the Beverly Center in Los Angeles, or Data Chrystal a large-scale, 3-D printed, A.I. data sculpture installed at the Portland Building in Portland, Oregon.

Further commissions include temporary installations such as the 'Infinity Room' project at the Zorlu Performing Arts Center during the 2015 Istanbul Biennial where he created an immersive environment transforming all surfaces of the room into an abstract infinite moving space. The 'Infinity Room' project was subsequently exhibited at the SXSW in Austin, Texas.

In 2018, Anadol was commissioned to project works onto the Walt Disney Concert Hall, as part of their anniversary celebration, with a 12-minute data sculpture animation named 'WDCH Dreams'. The animation featured an array of digitally abstracted photographs, audio and video recordings found inside concert halls archive.

In 2019, he designed 'Machine Hallucination' an immersive audiovisual installation, on view at Artechouse, a digital art space in New York's Chelsea Market. The project processed datasets of publicly available images of New York City including over 300 million photos, and 113 million other raw data points. In the same year, Anadol created 'Seoul Haemong', a 16-minute projection onto the Dongdaemun Design Plaza (DDP) building in Seoul, South Korea by architect Zaha Hadid, celebrating the Korean year-end holiday season.

In 2020, his work was part of the Melbourne's NGV Triennial in Australia. His project "Quantum Memories" consisted of a screen measuring 35 ft by 35 ft.

In 2021, Anadol was commissioned by the Pilevneli Gallery in Istanbul to create "Machine Memoirs: Space".

As of 2021, Anadol is on the faculty at the Design Media Arts School at UCLA.

In 2021 he participated in Venice's Architecture  Biennale di Venezia with Turkish/American artist Gökhan S. Hotamışlıgil.

In 2021, Anadol created an installation for Bulgari, an Italian luxury brand, to honor the unique creativity behind the Serpenti collection. This was inspired by “the concept of metamorphosis, embodied by the Maison’s most coveted design icon”, and was claimed as the first artificial intelligence artwork done for a luxury brand. The initialization was in Piazza Duomo and was accessible to the public from October 4 until the 31st.

Awards 
Anadol has received several awards and recognition for this work including the Microsoft Research's Best Vision Award, German Design Award, UCLA Art+Architecture Moss Award, University of California Institute for Research in the Arts Award, SEGD Global Design Awards and Google's Art and Machine Intelligence Artist Residency Award.

NFTs 
The Machine Hallucination series is inspired by his studio's collaboration with NASA JPL and his long-term research into the photographic history of space exploration. The IP rights for eight video artwork installations from the series were sold at a Sotheby's Hong Kong auction for US $5 million. The sale set a new record in Asia for being the most expensive NFT collection sold by a single artist.

References 

1985 births
Living people
21st-century American male artists
21st-century Turkish male artists
Artificial intelligence art
Artists from Istanbul
New media artists
University of California, Los Angeles alumni
Turkish emigrants to the United States